Tadali is a village in Chandrapur district of Nagpur Division of Maharashtra, India.

The village is served by Tadali Junction which is a railway junction station under Nagpur division of Central Railway zone of Indian Railways. It is on the New Delhi–Chennai main line with a line to Ghugus which branches off to the south-west.

References

Villages in Chandrapur district